Kulesha is a surname of Ukrainian origin. In the Ukrainian language kulesha means a porridge of maize flour.

Notable people with the surname include:

Artyom Kulesha (born 1990), Russian footballer
Gary Kulesha (born 1954), Canadian musician
Iryna Kulesha (born 1986), Belarusian weightlifter

See also
 
 Kulesza
 Kulish

Ukrainian-language surnames